The first USS Roselle (SP-350) was a minesweeper that served in the United States Navy during 1917. Roselle was built as a commercial steam harbor tug of the same name in 1903 by Neafie and Levy at Philadelphia. On 10 May 1917, the U.S. Navy acquired her from her owners, the Central Railroad Company of New Jersey, for use as a minesweeper during World War I. She was commissioned on 22 September 1917 as USS Roselle (SP-350). Assigned to the 3rd Naval District, Roselle was based at Tompkinsville, Staten Island, New York. She conducted minesweeping patrols in Long Island Sound.

On 31 December 1917, the Navy returned Roselle to the Central Railroad Company of New Jersey, which required her services for work deemed vital to national defense. Roselle continued in commercial service after World War I under various owners. In 1936, she was renamed Fearless. Fearlesss name disappeared from registers of commercial vessels in 1942.

References

Department of the Navy Naval History and Heritage Command Online Library of Selected Images: Civilian Ships: Roselle (American Harbor Tug, 1903). Served as USS Roselle (SP-350) in 1917
NavSource Online: Section Patrol Craft Photo Archive: Roselle (SP 350)

Minesweepers of the United States Navy
Ships built by Neafie and Levy
World War I minesweepers of the United States
1903 ships